Novum Testamentum is an academic journal covering various aspects of the New Testament.

Biblical studies journals
Publications established in 1956
Brill Publishers academic journals
Quarterly journals
English-language journals